Acropora robusta is a species of acroporid coral found in the Red Sea, the Gulf of Aden, the southwest and northern Indian Ocean, the central Indo-Pacific, Australia, Southeast Asia, Japan, the East China Sea and the oceanic west and central Pacific Ocean. It was described by Dana in 1846.

Description
It occurs in irregular colonies consisting of thick branches towards the centre, but its outer branches are thinner. Its rasp-like radial corallites can be of a variety of diameters and shapes. The species pink- or yellow-brown, cream, or bright green with branches having pinkish ends.

Distribution
It is classed as a least concern species on the IUCN Red List, but it is believed that its population is decreasing, and it is listed under Appendix II of CITES. Figures of its population are unknown, but is likely to be threatened by the global reduction of coral reefs, the increase of temperature causing coral bleaching, climate change, human activity, the crown-of-thorns starfish (Acanthaster planci) and disease. It occurs in the Red Sea, the Gulf of Aden, the southwest and northern Indian Ocean, the central Indo-Pacific, Australia, Southeast Asia, Japan, the East China Sea and the oceanic west and central Pacific Ocean.

Taxonomy
It was described as Madrepora robusta in 1846 by Dana.

References

Acropora
Corals described in 1846